Eupithecia amathes is a moth in the family Geometridae first described by Louis Beethoven Prout in 1926. It is found in the Democratic Republic of the Congo.

References

Moths described in 1926
amathes
Moths of Africa